Charlie Flannigan (c. - 1893) was an Indigenous stockman from Queensland who was the first person to be executed in the Northern Territory in 1883.

Biography 
Flannigan came to the Northern Territory in 1883. He shot dead the acting manager "Greenhide Sam" Croker of Auvergne Station, a remote Northern Territory cattle station on 20 September 1892 during a dispute over a game of cards.

He escaped to Western Australia, later turning himself in. He was transported to Darwin where he was incarcerated in Darwin's Fannie Bay Gaol in 1893. He was then sentenced to death.

Whilst waiting to be executed, Flannigan did 82 drawings that are now held at the South Australian Museum.

He was executed on just after 9:00am on 15 July 1893.

An exhibition of Flannigan's drawings A Little Bit of Justice were displayed at the Northern Territory Library in Parliament House in Darwin in 2021.

References 

Australian stockmen
People executed by South Australia
1893 deaths
Year of birth unknown